Germán Andres Márquez (born February 22, 1995) is a Venezuelan professional baseball pitcher for the Colorado Rockies of Major League Baseball (MLB). He won a Silver Slugger Award in 2018.

Career

Tampa Bay Rays
Márquez signed with the Tampa Bay Rays as an international free agent in July 2011. The Rays added him to their 40-man roster after the 2015 season.

Colorado Rockies
On January 28, 2016, Márquez and Jake McGee were traded to the Colorado Rockies in exchange for Corey Dickerson and Kevin Padlo. Marquez was promoted to the Major Leagues on September 6, 2016.

2017
In his first full season in 2017, Márquez went 11-7 with a 4.39 ERA in 162 innings (29 starts), notching a 1.38 WHIP and 147 strikeouts (8.17 K/9). He had the highest zone percentage of all major league pitchers, with 53.2% of his pitches being in the strike zone. He finished fifth in the National League Rookie of the Year voting.

2018
On July 11, 2018, Márquez hit his first career home run off second baseman and former teammate Daniel Descalso in a 19-2 Rockies win over the Arizona Diamondbacks. Márquez became the first pitcher to hit a home run off a position player since Mike LaCoss in 1986.

On September 26, 2018, Márquez tied a major-league record by striking out the first eight batters of a game against the Philadelphia Phillies, before pitcher Nick Pivetta reached base on an error on a 0-2 pitch. Márquez also broke the franchise record for single-season strikeouts in a season which had been previously held by Ubaldo Jiménez back in 2010.

Márquez had a dominant second half of the 2018 season after working a slider into his pitching repertoire.  He ultimately finished with a 14-11 record (his 14 wins were 9th-most in the NL) and 3.77 ERA in 33 starts (2nd; 20 of which were quality outings), with 230 strikeouts (4th) in 196 innings pitched (9th). He had a WHIP of 1.20. His 10.561 K/9 (fourth in the National League) was a new franchise record.  Márquez also had a phenomenal season at the plate, hitting .300 (18 for 60) with a home run, 5 RBIs, and a .650 OPS. He received the Silver Slugger Award as the best-hitting pitcher in the National League, becoming the first Rockies pitcher to win the award since Mike Hampton in 2002. Marquez's performance, along with the breakout season of Colorado native Kyle Freeland are widely credited with helping the Rockies reach the postseason in back to back years for the first time in franchise history.

2019
At the start of the 2019 season, the Rockies and Márquez agreed to a 5-year $43 million contract. On April 14, 2019, Márquez threw the first one-hit complete game in Rockies franchise history in a 4-0 win, yielding only a single to Evan Longoria in the 8th inning.  In 2019, he started 28 games, winning 12, and had a 4.76 ERA before being placed on the injured list with right arm inflammation on August 26. Though his ERA was a full point higher than that of 2018, Marquez by and large maintained his consistency from the previous year. Additionally, Marquez's ERA was ballooned by 3 games where he was not taken out despite struggling badly; the last of which was a home game on July 15, 2019 where he gave up a career-worst 11 runs (all earned) in only 2.2 innings to the San Francisco Giants before he was taken out of the game.

2020
In 2020, Márquez went 4–6 with a 3.75 ERA in 13 starts. On defense he led all major league pitchers in errors, with three, and had the lowest fielding percentage, at .750.

2021
On June 29, 2021, Márquez took a no-hit bid into the 9th inning against the Pittsburgh Pirates, but a leadoff single by Ka'ai Tom broke it up. He ended up with a one-hit shutout. He was named to his first All-Star team as the Rockies' sole representative. Márquez hit the second home run of his career on July 31, against the San Diego Padres. 

He finished the 2021 season with a 12–11 record, a 4.40 ERA, and 176 strikeouts over 180 innings in 32 starts. He led the major leagues with 15 wild pitches.

He was a finalist for the Silver Slugger Award, which was won by Max Fried.

2022
In 2022 he was 9-13 with a 4.95 ERA, as hitters had a .467 slugging percentage against him, the highest against any MLP qualified pitcher.

See also
 List of Major League Baseball players from Venezuela

References

External links

1995 births
Living people
Albuquerque Isotopes players
Bowling Green Hot Rods players
Charlotte Stone Crabs players
Colorado Rockies players
Hartford Yard Goats players
Major League Baseball pitchers
Major League Baseball players from Venezuela
Princeton Rays players
Silver Slugger Award winners
Venezuelan expatriate baseball players in the United States
Venezuelan Summer League Rays players
People from Ciudad Guayana